RS200 can refer to:

Ford RS200 group B racing car
Toyota Altezza RS200, an inline-4 version of the Lexus IS unique to Japan.
RS200 sailing dinghy
Polar RS200 heart rate monitor